Lipolagus ochotensis, the eared blacksmelt, is a species of deep-sea smelt found in the Pacific Ocean down to depths of .

References
 

Bathylagidae
Monotypic fish genera
Fish described in 1938